Tehovec is a small settlement in the hills southwest of Medvode in the Upper Carniola region of Slovenia.

Name
Tehovec was recorded in written sources in 1763–87 as Tehouz. The name may be derived from the Slavic hypocorism *Těxъ, thus referring to an early inhabitant of the place.

Church
The local church is dedicated to Saint Florian. The church was first mentioned in written sources in 1548; additional construction took place in the 16th century and first half of the 17th century. The main altar, dedicated to Saint Florian, dates to 1751. The church also contains side altars dedicated to Saint Primus and Saint Wolfgang.

Other cultural heritage
In addition to Saint Florian's Church, two other structures in Tehovec have designated cultural heritage status:
 A stone monument to members of the hunting society was erected below the church on 16 June 1935.
 The stone granary at the farm at Tehovec no. 1 is built above a cellar and the year 1842 is written on the facade. The upper floor is reached by a single flight of steps, and the entry arch is supported by two columns.

References

External links

Tehovec on Geopedia

Populated places in the Municipality of Medvode